The 1989–90 Courage Area League North was the third full season of rugby union within the fourth tier of the English league system, currently known as National League 2 North, and was the counterpart to Courage Area League South (currently National League 2 South). It would be the last season the division would be called Area League North as it would be renamed National 4 North for the following campaign. The title battle was very strongly contested, but the end it would be Broughton Park who would triumph as league champions despite finishing dead level with runners up Morley, thanks to a far superior points/for against record. Both sides would be promoted to the 1990–91 National Division Three.  

At the opposite end of the table it was a different story, with Stoke-on-Trent being the worse side in the division, failing to gain a single point as they finished last.  However, Stoke were granted a reprieve as no northern clubs were relegated from the 1989–90 National Division Three meaning they had another season in the league.

Structure

Each team played one match against each of the other teams, playing a total of ten matches each.  The champions are promoted to National Division 3 and the bottom team was relegated to either North 1 or Midlands 1 depending on their locality.

Participating teams and locations

League table

Sponsorship
Area League North is part of the Courage Clubs Championship and was sponsored by Courage Brewery.

See also
 National League 2 North

References

N4
National League 2 North